The 2000 Pan American Race Walking Cup was held in Poza Rica, Veracruz, México.  The track of the Cup runs in the Boulevard Adolfo Ruiz Cortínez.

A detailed report was given by Juan Ramon Pina.  The Mexican Athletics Federation used the event as trials for the Olympic Games in Sydney.  Therefore, a great number of guest athletes competed out of competition.

Complete results, medal winners until 2011, and the results for the Mexican athletes were published.

Medallists

Results

Men's 20 km

*: Started as a guest out of competition.

Team

Men's 50 km

*: Started as a guest out of competition.

Team

Women's 20 km

*: Started as a guest out of competition.

Team

Participation
The participation of 72 athletes (plus 58 guest athletes) from 12 countries is reported. 

 (1)
 (5)
 (9)
 (6)
 (1)
 (4)
 (5)
 (7)
 México (15)
 (1)
 (2)
 (15)

See also
 2000 Race Walking Year Ranking

References

Pan American Race Walking Cup
Pan American Race Walking Cup
Pan American Race Walking Cup
International athletics competitions hosted by Mexico